USS Peacock (AM-46) was a  built for the United States Navy during World War I.

Peacock was laid down on 31 August 1918 by Staten Island Shipbuilding Company of Staten Island, New York; launched on 8 April 1919; sponsored by Miss A.M. Danner; and commissioned on 27 December 1919.

After fitting out, Peacock remained at her berth at the New York Navy Yard until decommissioned 14 February 1920 and loaned to the Shipping Board on the same date. She was struck from the Naval Vessel Register on 22 April 1941.

References

External links 
 

 

Lapwing-class minesweepers
Ships built in Maryland
1919 ships
Tugboats of the United States
World War II shipwrecks in the Caribbean Sea
Maritime incidents in August 1940
Ships sunk in collisions